Ferdinand IV is the name of:
Ferdinand IV of Castile (1285–1312), king of Castile and León from 1295
Ferdinand IV of Germany (1633–1654, king of the Romans from 1653, of Bohemia from 1646, of Hungary from 1647)
Ferdinand IV of Naples (1751–1825, king 1759–1799; 1799–1806; 1815–1816) (Ferdinand III of Sicily 1759–1816)
Ferdinand IV of Tuscany (1835–1908, grand-duke 1859–1860)